Taïx is a commune in the Tarn department in southern France.

Geography
The river Vère rises in the south-eastern part of the commune, then flows westward through its southern part.

See also
 Communes of the Tarn department

References

Communes of Tarn (department)